Dudinskoye is a rural locality (a village) in Mayskoye Rural Settlement, Vologodsky District, Vologda Oblast, Russia. The population was 159 as of 2002. There are 6 streets.

Geography 
Dudinskoye is located 10 km northwest of Vologda (the district's administrative centre) by road. Staroye is the nearest rural locality.

References 

Rural localities in Vologodsky District